Marriages Forbidden is a 1957 West German comedy film directed by Heinz Paul and starring Ingeborg Cornelius, Helga Franck and Siegfried Breuer. It was one of many heimatfilm made during the decade.

The film's sets were designed by the art directors Hans Ledersteger and Ernst Richter.

Cast

References

Bibliography 
 Willi Höfig. Der deutsche Heimatfilm 1947–1960. 1973.

External links 
 

1957 films
1957 comedy films
German comedy films
West German films
1950s German-language films
Films directed by Heinz Paul
Films based on Austrian novels
1950s German films